Émile Schneider (born March 30, 1989 in Granby, Quebec) is a Canadian film and television actor. He is most noted for his performance in the film Where Atilla Passes (Là où Attila passe), for which he garnered a nomination for the Prix Iris for Best Actor in 2017.

He has also appeared in the films Après la neige, The Lion's Path (Le rang du lion), Les poètes de Ferré, Kiss Me Like a Lover (Embrasse-moi comme tu m'aimes), Le pacte des anges, Forgotten Flowers (Les fleurs oubliées), I'll End Up in Jail (Je finirai en prison), Maria Chapdelaine and The Vinland Club (Le Club Vinland), and the television series Trauma, Mémoires vives, L'Imposteur, Sortez-moi de moi, La Faille, Portrait-Robot and Virage.

References

External links

1989 births
Canadian male film actors
Canadian male television actors
Male actors from Quebec
People from Granby, Quebec
Living people